Events in the year 1633 in the Spanish Netherlands and Prince-bishopric of Liège (predecessor states of modern Belgium).

Incumbents

Habsburg Netherlands
Monarch – Philip IV, King of Spain and Duke of Brabant, of Luxembourg, etc.

Governor General – Isabella Clara Eugenia, Infanta of Spain, to 1 December; then Marquis of Aytona as acting governor-general

Prince-Bishopric of Liège
Prince-Bishop – Ferdinand of Bavaria

Events
January
 27 January – Isabella approves a peace deal with the Dutch Republic on the condition of acknowledgement of Habsburg sovereignty.

April
 1 April – Dutch refuse to acknowledge Habsburg sovereignty; peace talks at an impasse.
 24 April – Great Council of Mechelen sentences René de Renesse, 1st Count of Warfusée to perpetual banishment and forfeiture of all goods for his role in the Conspiracy of Nobles.

May
 11 May – Siege of Rheinberg commences.

December
 27 December – Peace talks in The Hague abandoned.

Publications
 Godefridus Vereycken, Tractatus de cognitione et conservatione sui (Mechelen, Henry Jaye).
 Richardus Versteganus, Medicamenten teghen de melancholie (Antwerp, Hendrik Aertssens), dedicated to Johannes Chrysostomus vander Sterre.

Births
Date uncertain
 Theodoor Aenvanck, painter (died 1690)
 Francisco Marcos de Velasco, governor of Antwerp Citadel (died 1693)

May
 8 May – Charles Eugene, 2nd Duke of Arenberg (died 1681)

August
 29 August – Louis-Alexander Scockart, diplomat (died 1708)

Deaths
Date uncertain
 Boetius à Bolswert (born c. 1585), engraver
 Jan de Wael I (born 1558), painter

March
 27 March – Peeter Cornet (born 1570/80), composer and organist

May
 31 May – Giles de Coninck (born 1571), Jesuit theologian

October
 21 October – Johannes Malderus (born 1563), bishop of Antwerp

December
 1 December – Isabella Clara Eugenia (born 1566), princess
 18 December – Theodoor Galle (born 1571), engraver.

References